Volleyball Thai-Denmark Super League is volleyball competition take the top teams from Volleyball Thailand League. First held in 2013, the only women's team later in 2014 have been added of men's teams.

Men

Current clubs 2019
  Air Force
  Diamond Food VC
  Visakha
  Nakhon Ratchasima The Mall 
  RMUTL Phitsanulok
  NK Fitness Samutsakorn

Previous winners

 2020 is cancel the competition because due to outbreak of covid-19

Titles by team

Medal table by team

Women

Current clubs 2019 
  Nakhon Ratchasima
  Supreme Chonburi
  3BB Nakornnont
  Quint Air Force
  Thai–Denmark Khonkaen Star
  Opart 369

Previous winners

 2020 is cancel the competition because due to outbreak of covid-19

Titles by team

Medal table by team

See also
 Men's Volleyball Thailand League
 Women's Volleyball Thailand League
 Men's Volleyball Pro Challenge
 Women's Volleyball Pro Challenge

References